Edward B. "Ed" Bullard (born November 28, 1943) is a former United States American politician and educator.

Born in Nassau, Bahamas, Edward Bullard served in the United States Army from 1966 to 1969. He received a Bachelor of Science degree in Sociology with a minor in Criminology in 1972 from Florida A&M University. He also received his master's degree in Education Administration (Grades 7–12) in 1976 from Florida A&M University as well.  A master's degree Education Administration (K-12) was earned from Nova Southeastern University in 1977. 
He retired from the Miami-Dade School system as an administrator. Bullard served 8 years from 2000 to 2008 in the Florida House of Representatives. His wife, Larcenia, and their son, Dwight Bullard, also served in the Florida State Legislature.

Notes

1943 births
Living people
Politicians from Miami
Florida A&M University alumni
Nova Southeastern University alumni
Educators from Florida
Democratic Party members of the Florida House of Representatives